The Lake Geneva region or Lemanic Region is the common name of the region of Switzerland encompassing the cantons of Geneva, Vaud and Valais. It is one of the NUTS-2 regions of Switzerland.

Lemanic Arc 

The Lemanic Arc (French: Arc lémanique) is the region on the north side of Lake Léman, stretching out from Geneva to Lausanne and Montreux. Its parts are Geneva, La Côte, Lausanne, Lavaux, La Riviera and le Chablais.

The cantons of Geneva and Vaud have a collaboration programme named Métropole lémanique.

Notes and references

See also 
 Suisse romande
 Health Valley

Regions of Switzerland
Romandy